The 1908–09 Rugby Union County Championship was the 21st edition of England's premier rugby union club competition at the time.  

Durham won the competition for the sixth time defeating Cornwall in the final.  It was Durham's tenth consecutive final appearance.

Final

See also
 English rugby union system
 Rugby union in England

References

Rugby Union County Championship
County Championship (rugby union) seasons